Sillunu Oru Kaadhal  is a 2006 Indian Tamil-language romantic drama film directed by N. Krishna from a  story by A. C. Durai. It stars Suriya, Jyothika and Bhumika, while Shriya Sharma, Sukanya, Vadivelu and Santhanam play supporting roles. The film's score and soundtrack were composed by A. R. Rahman, with lyrics by the Indian poet Vaali; cinematography for the film was handled by R. D. Rajasekhar and editing was handled by Anthony. The film was released on 8 September 2006, three days before the wedding of Suriya and Jyothika. Bhumika Chawla made her comeback in Tamil cinema after 5 years in this movie. The film was first titled as Jillunu Oru Kadhal, and it is then changed to Sillunu Oru Kadhal to have a pure-Tamil name.

In 2015, this film was remade into Marathi as Tu Hi Re, starring Swapnil Joshi, Sai Tamhankar, Tejaswini Pandit and  directed by Sanjay Jadhav.

Plot
Kundavi was brought up in a small village called Ambasamudram. She, along with her two friends, decide to have a love marriage. However she is not so successful. Her father arranges her marriage to Gowtham against her wishes. Both look gloomy during the wedding due to obvious reasons.

Six years later in Mumbai they have a five-year-old daughter Ishwarya and live as a happily in love married couple. Gowtham works as the chief mechanical engineer at Maruti Suzuki and Kundavi works at a local call center. Gowtham goes to New York City for a short period. During this time, Kundavi comes across Gowtham's old college diary. Gowtham wanted to be an engineer from a young age and forced his father's brother to pay for a seat in Coimbatore for mechanical engineering. From the second year of college he is the don. In college, he is attracted to Ishwarya, whose father is a Coimbatore MP. Gowtham and Ishwarya fall in love and decide to get married. At the registrar's office after Gowtham ties the knot, Ishwarya's father and his men beat him up, separating the lovers and sending Ishwarya off to Sydney, Australia. At the end of the diary, Gowtham writes a note: "If I have one wish, it would be to live with Ishwarya happily at least for one day." Then, due to his uncle's last wish at death bed, Gowtham agrees to marry Kundavi.

Gowtham returns from New York and finds his wife changed. She works late and avoids him. Once Kundavi finds out he does love her and how much he missed her during New York trip, she finds his lost love who had just returned from Australia. Ishwarya has become a modern girl in contrast to the demure salwar kameez girl she was in college, and completely ignores her father at the airport due to his past behaviour with her. Kundavi asks Ishwarya to visit them and she tells her husband that he should live happily with Ishwarya for a day and that for that one day, she and their daughter do not exist for him, and leaves Gowtham with Ishwarya.

Gowtham spends the day with Ishwarya. They travel to many places and do many things and recollect their memories. Ishwarya and Gowtham share their love for each other and how they missed each other during these 6 years of separation. They eventually fall in love with each other all over again and soon get intimate. It is then revealed that all these things were just Kundavi's dream. Panicked by the dream, Kundavi decides to check up on them. When she gets back home dreading, she finds her husband alone. She asks him where Ishwarya is and finds Ishwarya's letter. In it, Ishwarya says that Kundavi gave them a day, but an hour was sufficient for them. 40 minutes of silence, 10 minutes of formal inquiries and 10 minutes of talking. Even in that 10 minutes talk with him, the words that came out of Gowtham was 'Kundavi' only. Ishwarya realises that they both are immensely in love and leading a very happy life. She wants to love Gowtham in her next birth also. But not as Ishu, but as Kundavi. She wishes the couple a happy life and leaves, never to return.

In the end, Gowtham confesses that he had hidden the secret of loving someone so that Kundavi doesn't get hurt as any girl would not bear her husband's love being shared. However, unlike others, Kundavi has brought the girl her husband loved in order to make him happy. They then cry in happiness and hug each other while Diwali fireworks blossom. Their daughter Ishu also joins them and the movie ends on a happy note.

Cast

 Suriya as Er. Gowtham
 Jyothika as Kundavi (Voice dubbed by Savitha Reddy)
 Bhumika as Ishwarya "Ishu" (Voice dubbed by Chinmayi)
 Shriya Sharma as Jr.Ishwarya "Ishu"
 Sukanya as Nirmala, Kundavi's boss
 Vadivelu as Vellaichaamy, Gowtham's co-brother
 Santhanam as Rajesh
 Thambi Ramaiah as Vellaichaamy's assistant
 Shobhana as Chellathaayi
 Sri Vidya as Tamil, Kundavi's friend
 Meenal as Subbu, Kundavi's friend
 R. D. Rajasekhar
 Anthony as an automobile engineer
 Halwa Vasu
 Sudha as Ishwarya's mother
 Kannan Ponnaiya as Senior College Student
 Kanaka

Production
Reports emerged in August 2005 that Suriya and Jyothika would come together for a project titled Jillendru Oru Kadhal based on a real life story newcomer N.Krishna would direct it. The team signed up A. R. Rahman to compose the film's music while Asin was selected for another key role in the film after her successful pairing with Suriya in Ghajini. However, by the time the film was launched in December 2005, Bhumika Chawla had replaced Asin.

The film was shot extensively in Rajamahendravaram, Visakhapatnam, with some portions in Mumbai, Coimbatore and Chennai and the college campus where shooting took place is Tamil Nadu Agricultural University, Coimbatore. while a song was shot in Switzerland masquerading it as New York. Initially touted as an August 2006 release, the film was delayed to avoid a clash with Jyothika's other film Vettaiyaadu Vilaiyaadu.

Soundtrack

The film features a soundtrack composed by A. R. Rahman. The music for the film was released on 2 August 2006 by K. M. Musiq and a day later in India by Star Music. Shreya Ghoshal won the Tamil Nadu State Film Awards and Filmfare Awards South for Best Female Playback Singer for the rendition of the song "Munbe Vaa".

Awards 
The film was Nominated for 4 Categories and won 2 of the 4 Nominees.
2006; Rahman won the Filmfare Award for Best Music Director – Tamil for the soundtrack
2006; Shreya Ghoshal won the Filmfare Award for Best Female Playback Singer – Tamil and Tamil Nadu Best Female Playback Singer
2006 ; Filmfare Award for Best Actress – Tamil - Jyothika - Nominated
2006 ;  Filmfare Award for Best Supporting Actress – Tamil - Bhumika Chawla - Nominated

Release
The satellite rights of the film were sold to Kalaignar TV. The film was censored on 4 September 2006 and was given with a "U/A" certificate, with some dialogue muting. The film opened across 207 screens worldwide on 8 September 2006, three days before the wedding of the lead pair Suriya and Jyothika. The film received a large opening, and became a superhit at boxoffice
. Critics primarily labelled the film as a disappointment as a result of the high levels of publicity it received prior to release. The Hindu gave the film a negative review, claiming that "The most talked about movie of the year, Studio Green's Sillunu Oru Kadhal featuring Suriya and Jyotika, arrives only to disappoint", further stating, "it lacks a strong cohesive script to bind the elements".

The film was later dubbed and released in Telugu as Nuvvu Nennu Prema.   In 2017, the film was dubbed into Hindi as Mohabbat Ke Dushman by Goldmines Telefilms Pvt. Ltd.

References

External links 
 

2006 films
Films shot in Andhra Pradesh
Films set in Mumbai
Films shot in Mumbai
Films shot in Coimbatore
Films shot in Chennai
Tamil films remade in other languages
Films shot in Switzerland
2006 romantic drama films
2000s Tamil-language films
Films scored by A. R. Rahman
Indian romantic drama films
2006 directorial debut films